Gregg Butler (born December 26, 1952) is a retired gridiron football player who played for the Philadelphia Bell, Edmonton Eskimos, Montreal Alouettes, Winnipeg Blue Bombers and Washington Federals. He played college football at Howard University and was inducted into The Howard University Athletic Hall of Fame in 2014. In 1979, Butler led the West in punt return yards with 623.

References

1952 births
Living people
Edmonton Elks players
Philadelphia Bell players
Montreal Alouettes players
Winnipeg Blue Bombers players
Howard Bison football players
Canadian football defensive backs
American football defensive backs